The Carson and Colorado Railway was a U.S.  narrow gauge railroad that ran from Mound House, Nevada, to Keeler, California below the Cerro Gordo Mines. It was incorporated on May 10, 1880 as the Carson and Colorado Railroad, and construction on the railroad began on May 31, 1880. The narrow gauge track was chosen to reduce cost. Much of the route now parallels U.S. Route 95 Alternate, U.S. Route 95, Nevada State Route 360, U.S. Route 6, and U.S. Route 395.

The Carson and Colorado began operations with a single Baldwin , the Candelaria. The first train arrived at Keeler on August 1, 1883. The railroad served an arid area heavily dependent on mineral resources for economic activity. The line was reorganized as the Carson and Colorado Railway in 1892 to reduce accumulated debt.

Sale to the Southern Pacific 
From its inception, the Carson and Colorado was a hindrance to the Virginia and Truckee Railroad (V&T), the parent company of the C&C, who sold the line to the Southern Pacific Company in 1900. Darius Ogden Mills (part owner) was once quoted saying "Either we built the line 300 miles too long, or 300 years too early!" Silver and gold discoveries at Tonopah, Nevada and Goldfield, Nevada provided a major boost of revenues shortly after the Southern Pacific purchase. From the time of the purchase until 1905, all of the C&C’s freight traveled over the V&T's trackage from Mound House to Reno, and vice versa. Because of the changeover from  narrow gauge to standard gauge cars, all the freight had to be handled by hand at Mound House, which caused a great bottleneck, especially after the mining booms of Tonopah and Goldfield. Southern Pacific (SP) proffered an offer to purchase the V&T, but the price was placed too high. As a result, the SP began constructing the Hazen cutoff, which circumvented the V&T entirely after it opened. The Nevada and California Railroad was reorganized into the Central Pacific Railroad in 1912. In the early 20th century, it operated under the name "Southern Pacific Keeler Branch". Portions of the line were abandoned in the 1930s and the 1940s, and the last narrow gauge common carrier made its final run on April 29, 1960. The rails were removed in January, 1961.

The former parent company, Virginia and Truckee Railroad, has been reconstructed from Virginia City to a station near Mound House. Passenger (tourist) service has been restored along much of the original V&T right of way, with investigations into returning service to Carson City again in the future.

Locomotives

Towns and railroad stations served by the C&C 

 Mound House, Nevada (V&T Railroad to Carson City and Virginia City)
 Dayton, Nevada
 Fort Churchill, Nevada
 Wabuska, Nevada (Copper Belt Railway to Yerington)
Lux, Nevada
 Moquist, Nevada
 Rio Vista, Nevada
Schurz, Nevada
 Stuckey, Nevada
 Copperhill, Nevada
 Gillis, Nevada
Rand, Nevada
 Magnus, Nevada
 Walker, Nevada
Thorne, Nevada
Hawthorne, Nevada (branch to Cottonwood)
Cottonwood, Nevada (branch only) 
Kinkead, Nevada
Luning, Nevada
 New Boston, Nevada
Mina, Nevada
Sodaville, Nevada (Soda Springs)
Rhodes, Nevada
 Tonopah Junction, Nevada (Tonopah and Goldfield Railroad)
Belleville, Nevada
 Filben, Nevada (spur to Candelaria)
Candelaria, Nevada (spur only)
Basalt, Nevada
Summit, Nevada (Mt. Montgomery)
 Queen, Nevada
Benton, California
Hammill, California
Laws, California, Owensville
Zurich, California
 Monola, California (formerly Alvord)
Kearsarge, California
Manzanar, California
Owenyo, California (Southern Pacific Railroad to Lone Pine, Ridgecrest, and Los Angeles)
 Alico, California
 Dolomite, California
 Mock, California
 Swansea, California
 Keeler, California

Restoration effort 
In Independence, California, a non-profit group re-incorporated the Carson and Colorado Railway. They have restored locomotive #18, which was left in Independence in excellent condition by the Southern Pacific in 1955. The locomotive moved under its own power for the first time in 62 years on Saturday October 15, 2016. The locomotive is currently housed in a two stall engine house at the Eastern California Museum in Independence, CA. There is close to 1000 feet of track for it to operate on. Former SP boxcars #1C and #15 are on rail with engine #18 as part of the exhibit.

Gallery of C&C equipment

See also
 Southern Pacific 8
 Southern Pacific 9
 Southern Pacific 18

References

Bibliography

Sources 
 Guide to the Carson & Colorado Railroad Company records, 1881–1901, at The Bancroft Library
 A Guide to the Carson and Colorado Railroad Records, NC71. Special Collections, University Libraries, University of Nevada, Reno.

External links 
 The Southern Pacific Narrow Gauge
 Carson and Colorado Railway Restoration Effort
 Exploring a Ghost Railroad
 Carson and Colorado Railway Facebook Page

Defunct California railroads
Defunct Nevada railroads
Narrow gauge railroads in California
Narrow gauge railroads in Nevada
3 ft gauge railways in the United States
Predecessors of the Southern Pacific Transportation Company
Mining in California
Mojave Desert
Owens Valley
History of Inyo County, California
Mining in Nevada
Railway companies established in 1892
Railway companies disestablished in 1905
1892 establishments in California
1905 disestablishments in California
Closed railway lines in the United States